Mount Trumbull is a populated place situated in Mohave County, Arizona, United States. It has also been known as Bundyville.

History
The town contained the Mount Trumbull School, a historic schoolhouse constructed in 1922. It served as a school, church, meeting room and dance hall for the surrounding area until its closure in 1966. After the original structure was destroyed by arson, an exact replica was rebuilt in 2001 and is currently open to the public as an educational exhibit.

Mount Trumbull's population was 111 in 1940.

References

External links
 Mount Trumbull – ghosttowns.com

Populated places in Mohave County, Arizona
Ghost towns in Arizona